Hannes Schüpbach is a Swiss filmmaker and painter, born in Winterthur, Switzerland in 1965.

Education
Schüpbach studied visual art at the academies of art and design in Zurich (Hochschule für Gestaltung) and in Basel (Hochschule für Gestaltung und Kunst) from 1988 to 1991. In 1992 he dedicated six months to cinema and  performance studies at New York University. During his education two figures were very important for their influence on the artist's cinematic language: Werner von Mutzenbecher and André Lehmann. They were his professors and both engaged in experimental film movement in Basel in the 1970s and 1980s.

Career
In 1999 Schüpbach established "Film direkt", a monthly series of artists' films at Filmpodium Zurich, where some publications on the art film were also issued. Hannes Schüpbach has become internationally known with his 16mm films, which he has presented in some of the most important European art institutions: Centre Pompidou, Paris; Biennale de l'Image en Mouvement, Geneva; Museum Reina Sofia, Madrid; Tate Modern, London.

From the first years of his artistic career, Schüpbach also worked as painter, creating "large, connected series of paintings". During his first solo exhibition, "Stills and Movies" at Kunsthalle Basel in 2009, a combination of his paintings and films was presented. The Kunsthalle Basel exhibition website states "both media are inseparably connected in his approach to his work. The films and the paintings are two idioms that Schüpbach adopts to articulate the major themes of his artistic work: the representation of time and movement and the complex processes of experiencing and remembering".

References 

 Kunsthalle Basel: Still and Movies
 Tate Modern London
 Art Display Blog
 Hannes Schupbach, Cinema Elements, Zurich, 2009 - 

20th-century Swiss painters
Swiss male painters
21st-century Swiss painters
21st-century Swiss male artists
Living people
1965 births
People from Winterthur
Swiss performance artists
Swiss contemporary artists
20th-century Swiss male artists